Frederick Falkiner Standish Smithwick (1879–1962) was an Irish rugby international. He won two caps in 1898.

Early life
Smithwick was the third son of Rev. Standish Poole Smithwick (1848-1909), rector of Monasterevin and chancellor of Kildare Cathedral, and his wife Caroline Anna Grant (d. 1942), daughter of George Grant Webb, of Ballyhay, County Down. The Smithwick family were landed gentry, of Youghal House and of Tullamore Park, both in County Tipperary. He was educated at Trinity College Dublin (B.A. 1901).

Career
Smithwick was ordained deacon in 1902 and priest in 1903. He was curate at Tralee from 1902 to 1904, then curate to the Forces at Aldershot, Bloemfontein and elsewhere, as well as to the British Expeditionary Force, from 1906 to 1931. He was rector of Ladbroke with Radbourne, Warwickshire from 1931 to 1936.

Personal life
Smithwick married firstly, in 1908, Violet Irene (d. 1922), daughter of William Perry Odlum, of Huntington, Queen's County, by whom he had two sons and two daughters. He married secondly Adelaide Florence, daughter of Fitzadam Millar, of Monkstown, County Dublin. He had bought Youghal House, Nenagh, county Tipperary, from his second cousin Charles Smithwick in 1935, becoming head of the Tipperary Smithwick family. He was succeeded by his eldest son, Major John Standish de Chair Smithwick (1915-1994), of the Royal Artillery.

References

Frederick Smithwick at Scrum.com
IRFU Profile

1879 births
1962 deaths
Irish rugby union players
Ireland international rugby union players
Monkstown Football Club players
Rugby union players from County Kildare
Rugby union centres